The 2017 Little League Softball World Series was held in Portland, Oregon from August 9 to August 16, 2017. Ten teams, four international teams and six from the from the United States, competed for the Little League Softball World Series Championship.

Teams
Each team that competed in the tournament came out of one of the 10 regions.

Results

All times US EST.

Elimination round

References

Little League Softball World Series
2017 in softball
2017 in sports in Oregon